Our Lady of Mount Carmel is a painting in oils on canvas by Moretto da Brescia, executed  and now in the Gallerie dell'Accademia in Venice. It arrived in the Accademia's collection in exchange for two paintings sent to the Tempio Canoviano in Possagno. The painting is one of the most notable works of the artist's youth. Its original location is unknown as the first confirmed written record of the work dates to the 19th century. It was probably in the Confraternity of Our Lady of Mount Carmel's altar in Santa Maria del Carmine church in Brescia; a reference to a "large canvas ... something of a large study in the hand of Moretto" in Bernardino Faino's 1630 guide to Brescian art may be to this work.

References

1522 paintings
Paintings in the Gallerie dell'Accademia
Paintings by Moretto da Brescia
Paintings of the Virgin Mary
Angels in art